The Archaeological Survey of Burma was a government agency responsible for archaeological research, conservation and preservation of cultural monuments in Burma. It was established in 1902 by British authorities, following a visit by Lord Curzon, Viceroy of India to Burma Province in 1901. Several noted Burmese scholars, including Gordon Luce and Pe Maung Tin, published for the agency. The functions of the agency has since been assumed by Ministry of Religious Affairs and Culture's Department of Archaeology and National Museum.

Publications 

 Report of the Superintendent, Archaeological Survey, Burma
 Report of the Director, Archaeological Survey of Burma

Directors 

 Emil Forchhammer
 Taw Sein Ko
 Charles Duroiselle
 Lu Pe Win
 Aung Thaw
 Oak Gar

See also 

 Archaeological Survey of India

References 

1902 establishments in British India
Government agencies of Myanmar